The Hanover Tomato is a mostly large variety of cultivated tomato grown in Hanover County, Virginia. While most Hanover Tomatoes that come to market are large fruits, they are not necessarily defined by their size but rather by the geographic setting—normally in coastal soil rich in sand—in which they are grown. The water retention in this type of soil is thought to influence the nature of the mature plant.

History
The history of the Hanover Tomato is somewhat unclear, with some sources claiming that "the Mantlo brothers who, back in the 1940s and ’50s, apparently discovered that when they cut the tap root on their plants, the fruits would mysteriously ripen faster", which enabled them to sell them earlier than their competitors at Richmond's 17th Street Farmers Market. Others dismiss this as a myth and reliable information is scarce.

Popularity
Today the Hanover Tomato is one of the most popular tomatoes in the Greater Richmond Region and in parts of Northern Virginia—a popularity underscored by the annual Hanover Tomato Festival held in Mechanicsville, Virginia.

See also

 List of tomato cultivars

References

Tomato cultivars